Pieter Cornelis "Piet" Souer (born 29 March 1948, Eindhoven) is a Dutch record producer, songwriter and arranger. His collaboration with acts (such as Luv', Mouth & MacNeal, Liesbeth List, Ramses Shaffy, American Gypsy, and Champagne) made him gain twenty two gold and platinum records', one Conamus Export Prize and one 'Outstanding Song Award', thanks to his composition "Too Young To Know", performed by Anita Meyer at World Popular Song Festival in Japan in 1981.

Debut
Piet Souer (a guitar and keyboard player) started his career as a member of The Valiants, a rock band from Eindhoven. His breakthrough happened when he played guitar on "De troubadour", a track performed by Lenny Kuhr, winner of the Eurovision Song Contest 1969. The next year, Kuhr, bassist Paul Reekers and Souer were the supporting act of Georges Brassens during his tour in France.

Producer, arranger, songwriter and conductor
In the early 1970s, he scored, as a songwriter and an arranger, moderate hits such as "I'm The Grand Pretender" and "Keep On Dancing" (performed by Cardinal Point) and "Angel Eyes" (performed by American Gypsy) as well as successful chart toppers in the Netherlands including "Te Veel Te Vaak"  (by Liesbeth List) and "Samen" (by Liesbeth List & Ramses Shaffy).
 
In 1976, he recorded with the conductor Harry van Hoof the album Strings by Candlelight (certified gold in the Netherlands). Then, he produced hit records for popular Dutch acts such as Champagne (1977 Export Award), Doris D. & The Pins, Vanessa, American Gypsy, Mouth & MacNeal, Anita Meyer, Maywood, Conquistador. He also collaborated with international artists including Vicky Leandros, Helen Shapiro, Katie Kissoon and Engelbert Humperdinck.

In 1982, Sylvie Vartan sang one of his composition ("La Sortie de Secours"), which was released as a single and was a French cover version of "I'm So Sorry" (originally performed by José Hoebee). The same year, British pop group Tight Fit covered "Fantasy Island" (one of his songs originally performed by The Millionaires) which became a UK Top 5 hit and a European Top 10 hit.

Luv'
In 1976, he teamed up with producer Hans van Hemert and manager Han Meijer (later replaced by Pim Ter Linde) to form a female pop trio: Luv'. Van Hemert and him wrote songs for the girl group (under the pseudonym Janschen & Janschens). In the late 1970s, Luv' had popular hit singles (such as "You're The Greatest Lover", "Trojan Horse" or "Casanova") in Benelux, German-speaking countries,  Denmark, Spain, France, South Africa, New Zealand and Mexico. This international success made Luv' win a Conamus Export Prize in 1979. This formation sold seven million records (singles and albums).

Eurovision Song Contest
Souer composed two songs for the Eurovision Song Contest: "Sing Me a Song" by Bernadette (in 1983) and "De eerste keer" by Maxine & Franklin Brown (in 1996). Both of them reached seventh position in the Contest.

TV jingles and film soundtracks
Souer has composed many film soundtracks and television jingles.

Scores for TV programs including:
 Suske en Wiske
 Ted Show
 Spoorloos
 the Dutch version of the game show Boggle
 the Dutch, American, Swedish and Polish versions of Lingo

He composed Bel canto themes for the NCRV show Una Voce Particolare hosted by Ernst Daniel Smid. His collaboration with Smid includes the Top 5 album Gevoel van Geluk.

Film soundtracks including:
 2005 movie about Vincent van Gogh
 Black Book, directed by Paul Verhoeven.
 Rembrandt van Rijn (Dutch Masters) (for the year of Rembrandt in 2006).

References

Bibliography
500 Nr.1 Hits uit de Top 40, by Johan van Slooten, Gottmer Becht Publishing, 1997
Top 40 Hitdossier 1956-2005 (9e editie), by Johan van Slooten, Gottmer Bech Publishing, 2006
50 jaar nummer-1-hits 1956-2006, by Johan van Slooten, Gottmer Uitgevers Groep, 2006
Albumdossier 1969-2002, by Johan van Slooten, Becht's Uitgevers, 2002

External links
 Official website
 Information about Souer's career on the Nationaal Pop Instituut website (in Dutch)
 Souer chart performances in the Netherlands on the DutchCharts.nl portal

1948 births
Living people
Dutch music managers
Dutch record producers
Dutch songwriters
Eurovision Song Contest conductors
People from Eindhoven
21st-century conductors (music)